Street's snake skink (Ophiomorus streeti) is a species of skink, a lizard in the family Scincidae. The species is from Iran.

References

Ophiomorus
Taxa named by Steven C. Anderson
Taxa named by Alan E. Leviton
Reptiles described in 1966